Han Chol-sim (born 16 December 1993) is a North Korean sport shooter.

She participated at the 2018 ISSF World Shooting Championships, winning a medal.

References

External links

Living people
1993 births
North Korean female sport shooters
ISSF pistol shooters